The Highland Council, the political body covering the Highland local authority created in 1995, comprises 21 wards, each electing three or four councillors by the single transferable vote system, which creates a form of proportional representation. The total number of councillors is 74, and the main meeting place and main offices are at the Highland Council Headquarters in Glenurquhart Road, Inverness.

Current administration
The most recent election of the council was on 5 May 2022. The largest group elected were 22 councillors from the SNP, who were joined by 21 independent, 15 Liberal Democrat, 10 Conservative, 4 Green and 2 Labour councillors. This was the first time since the Council's inception that independent councillors did not form the largest grouping. Following the election, the SNP and the 17-member Highland Independent group formed the administration. Three other independents changed their label to reflect their locality (Caithness, Inverness, and Sutherland independent), while one remains with the standard independent label.

Wards
As of 2017, there are 21 wards, each of which is represented by 3 or 4 councillors.  Ward forums are held by the councillors representing each ward: these meetings are open to the public. A Ward Manager is appointed to each ward or group of wards. Each ward receives a small discretionary budget that is managed by the ward manager.

The councillors representing groups of wards also sit as area committees, each covering areas which to some extent correspond with former local government boundaries. There are area committees for the counties of Caithness, Sutherland and Nairnshire, as well the city of Inverness. The remaining area committees cover Badenoch and Strathspey, the Black Isle, Dingwall and Seaforth, Easter Ross, Lochaber, the Isle of Skye and Raasay, and Wester Ross, Strathpeffer and Lochalsh.

History
The first elections to the Highland Council were in 1995, when the unitary council was created under the Local Government etc. (Scotland) Act 1994. Since then, there have been general elections of the council at four year intervals. From 1999 to 2007 these elections coincided with general elections of the Scottish Parliament, but the 2012 council election was delayed by a year, until 2012, to end this coincidence. Since then elections have been held every five years, both at council and national level.

The new council was created to replace a regional council and eight district councils, which had been created under the Local Government (Scotland) Act 1973, and were abolished in 1996. Until 2007, the new council maintained decentralised management and committee structures which related to former district boundaries, except this arrangement was compromised by changes to ward boundaries in 1999, so that committees ceased to represent exactly the areas for which they were making decisions. New management and committee structures, involving three corporate management areas and related committees, were created at the same time as the introduction of multi-member wards and single transferable vote elections in 2007.

The 1995 election created a council of 72 members, each elected from a single-member ward by the first past the post system of election. Ward boundaries were redrawn for the 1999 election, to create 80 single-member wards and, again, election was by the first past the post system. The same wards and the same system of election were used for the 2003 election. For the 2007 election, ward boundaries were redrawn again, under the Local Governance (Scotland) Act 2004, to create the 22 multi-member wards, each electing three or four councillors by the single transferable vote system, but still electing a total of 80 councillors. For the 2017 election, the number of wards was reduced to 21, and the total number of councillors to 74. New ward boundaries were proposed by Boundaries Scotland in 2021 which would have reduced the total number of councillors to 73, however these were rejected by the Scottish Parliament.

The eight older management areas, created when district councils were abolished in 1996, were also groups of wards, and each management area had an area committee of councillors elected from the wards in the area. Three of the older management areas, Caithness, Nairn and Sutherland, were very similar to earlier local government counties. Two others, Inverness and Ross and Cromarty, had the names of earlier counties but have very different boundaries.

In 2007, the then 22 wards were divided between three corporate management areas, and each of these was subdivided to create a total of 16 ward management areas. Some wards are grouped into larger areas for ward management purposes, and one ward is divided between two different ward management areas. Therefore, the number of ward management areas is less than the number of wards.

The corporate management areas were named as (1) Caithness, Sutherland and Easter Ross, (2) Inverness, Nairn, and Badenoch and Strathspey, and (3) Ross, Skye and Lochaber. Two of these names are also those of Westminster Parliament (House of Commons) constituencies, and one name is very similar to the name of another Westminster constituency, but constituency and corporate management area boundaries are different.

Corporate management areas were represented, for some purposes, by their own committees. Also, there was an Inverness city management area covering seven of the nine wards (and thus four of the six ward management areas) of the Inverness, Nairn, and Badenoch and Strathspey corporate management area, with the city area being represented by a city committee.

The former management areas were:

The numbers of wards in each corporate management area, and the number of councillors representing them, was as follows:

For lists of historic wards and details of how they were grouped into corporate and ward management areas, see:
 Highland Council wards 1995 to 1999
 Highland Council wards 1999 to 2007
 Highland Council wards created in 2007

References

External links

 

Politics of Highland (council area)
Highland
Organisations based in Inverness